Pheas River (Stung Pheas, spelled also Stoĕng Pheas) is a river in Cambodia. It is a major tributary of the Tonlé Sap.

References

Rivers of Cambodia
Tonlé Sap